Guanyinge Subdistrict is a subdistrict in and the seat of Benxi Manchu Autonomous County, Liaoning province, China. , it has 11 residential communities and 3 villages under its administration.

See also 
 List of township-level divisions of Liaoning

References 

Township-level divisions of Liaoning